José María de la Concepción Apolinar Vargas Vila Bonilla (June 23, 1860 – May 23, 1933), commonly referred to as José María Vargas Vila, was a Colombian writer and public intellectual.

Vargas Vila was an autodidact, who, from an early age, participated in political struggles as a journalist, political agitator, and orator. He was considered one of the most controversial writers in the Americas at the beginning of the twentieth century. Vargas Vila distinguished himself through his radically liberal ideas and his criticism the Catholic clergy, conservatism, and the imperialist policies of the United States. Many of his ideas approached those of existentialism and were claimed to be libertarian, although they were so close to anarchism that at one time even Vargas Vila declared himself an anarchist. He defended all causes and individuals who fought for their peoples' liberty and justice, especially in Latin America, without harping on whether they all shared his exact same philosophy, and knowing that they did not.

The publication of his novel Ibis in 1900 caused him to be excommunicated by the Holy See, a development that pleased him.

Bibliography 
 Aura o las violetas.  1887
 Pasionarias, álbum para mi madre muerta. 1887.
 Emma, Maracaibo. 1888  (En una publicación literaria).
 Aura o las violetas; Emma. 1889.
 Lo irreparable. 1889.
 Los Providenciales. 1892.
 Flor de fango. 1895.
 Ibis. 1900.
 A la hora del crepúsculo. 1900?.
 Alba roja, París. 1901.
 Las rosas de la tarde. 1901.
 Ante los bárbaros: el Yanki. He ahí el enemigo. 1902.
 Copos de espuma. 1902.
 Los divinos y los humanos.1904.
 La simiente, París. 1906.
 Laureles rojos. 1906.
 El canto de las sirenas en los mares de la historia. 1906?.
 Los Césares de la decadencia. 1907.
 El camino del triunfo. 1909.
 La república romana. 1909.
 La conquista de Bizancio. 1910.
 La voz de las horas. 1910.
 Hombres y crímenes del Capitolio. 1910?.
 El ritmo de la vida: motivos para pensar. 1911.
 Huerto agnóstico; Cuadernos de un solitario. 1911.
 Rosa mística; mes nouvelles. 1911
 Ibis. 1911?, Novela, edición completa.
 Políticas e históricas (páginas escogidas). 1912.
 El imperio romano. 1912?.
 Archipiélago sonoro, poemas sinfónicos. 1913
 Ars-verba. 1913.
 En las zarzas del Horeb. 1913.
 El alma de los lirios". 1914
 El rosal Pensante. 1914
 La muerte del cóndor; del Poema de la tragedia y de la historia. 1914.
 Los parias Pretéritas, Prólogo de R. Palacio Viso. 1915.
 Clepsidra roja. 1915?
 En las cimas. 1915?
 La demencia de Job. 1916. (Novela)
 Prosas selectas'. 1916.
 María Magdalena. 1916? (Novela).
 Ante los bárbaros (los Estados Unidos y la Guerra) el yanki: he ahí el enemigo 1917.
 El cisne blanco (novela psicológica). 1917.
 Eleonora (novela de la vida artística).  1917.
 Los discípulos de Emaüs (novela de la vida intelectual). 1917.
 María Magdalena; novela lírica. 1917.
 Rubén Darío. 1917.
 El huerto del silencio. 1917?.
 Horario reflexivo. 1917?
 Los estetas de Teópolis. 1918.
 Páginas escogidas. 1918.
 La ubre de la loba, Barcelona. 1918?.
 El minotauro. 1919.
 Cachorro de león (novela de almas rústicas). 1920.
 De los viñedos de la eternidad. 1920.
 De sus lises y de sus rosas. 1920.
 El final de un sueño. 1920.
 Libre estética. 1920.
 Salomé, novela poema. 1920.
 Belona dea orbi. 1921.
 El huerto del silencio. 1921.
 Prosas-laudes, Barcelona. 1921.
 Gestos de vida. 1922.
 Mis mejores cuentos. 1922.
 Saudades tácitas. 1922.
 Némesis.  1923
 Antes del último sueño (páginas de un vademécum). 1924.
 Mi viaje a la Argentina; odisea romántica. 1924?
 La cuestión religiosa en México. 1926.
 Los Soviets. Con Carta-prólogo de D. Oscar Pérez Solís. 1926.
 Odisea romántica; diario de viaje a la República Argentina. 1927.
 Dietario crepuscular. 1928.
 La novena sinfonía. 1928?.
 Lirio negro. Germania. 1930.
 Lirio rojo. Eleonora. 1930.
 Sobre las viñas muertas.1930.
 Tardes serenas. 1930.
 Lirio blanco. Delia. 1932.
 El maestro. 1935.
 El joyel mirobolante (desfile de visiones). 1937.
 José Martí: apóstol-libertador. 1938.
 El sendero de las almas: novelas cortas. Sin fecha.
 Históricas y Políticas. Sin fecha.
 Poemas sinfónicos, Barcelona. Sin fecha.
 Polen lírico, conferencias. Sin fecha.
 Sombras de Águilas. Sin fecha.

References

 La Gran Enciclopedia de Colombia del Círculo de Lectores, "Biographical Profile of José María Vargas Vila" (Banco de la Republica)
 Raul Salazar Pazos 2008 biography and founder of the diary of Vargas Vila Vargas Vila.com
 Cobo Borda, Juan Gustavo 1980 DISIDENTE semana.com.doc "El divino iracundo"; Semana 1112, 12 de noviembre de 1980.
 Sánchez, Ricardo 1981 "El Anti-imperialismo de Vargas Vila", Prólogo de Ante los Bárbaros. Bogotá: Editorial La Oveja Negra.
 Vargas Arango, María Isabel 1993 "José maría Vargas Vila"; Gran Enciclopedia de Colombia del Círculo de Lectores, tomo de biografías.
 Complete Works of José María Vargas Vila "Free Esthetic"

External links

José María Vargas Vila sources online
 
 José María Vargas Vila Digital Library / Biblioteca Digital de José María  www.lib.unc.edu/wilson/rbc/vargasvila

19th-century Colombian novelists
20th-century Colombian novelists
Colombian male novelists
1860 births
1933 deaths
People excommunicated by the Catholic Church
People from Bogotá